Showa Maru No. 7 (Japanese: 第七昭和丸) was an auxiliary minesweeper of the Imperial Japanese Navy during World War II.

History
Showa Maru No. 7 was laid down on 1 April 1936 at the shipyard of K.K. Osaka Tekkosho Honsha Kojo at the behest of shipping company, Nippon Suisan K.K. She was launched on 24 July 1936 and completed 31 August 1936. On 12 September 1941, she was requisitioned by the Imperial Japanese Navy and converted to an auxiliary minesweeper under Reserve Lieutenant Takahashi Teruhisa (高橋輝藏). Takahashi served until 18 September 1941 when he was replaced by Reserve Lieutenant Terauchi Saburo (寺内三郎). Terauchi served until he was replaced by Reserve Lieutenant Tanaka Ginzo (田中銀造) on 1 May 1944. All three ships were sunk. She was removed from the Navy list on 10 March 1945.

References

1936 ships
Ships built in Japan
Maritime incidents in January 1945
World War II minesweepers of Japan
Mine warfare vessels of the Imperial Japanese Navy
Auxiliary ships of the Imperial Japanese Navy